Letheobia sudanensis, also known as the Garamba gracile blind snake or Sudan baked snake, is a species of snake in the Typhlopidae family. It is endemic to Africa.

References

Further reading
 Schmidt, K.P. et al. 1923. Contributions to the herpetology of the Belgian Congo based on the collection of the American Museum Congo Expedition, 1909-1915: Part II.-Snakes. Bull. Amer. Mus. Nat. Hist. 49(1):1-146. (Typhlops sudanensis, pp. 51–53.)

Letheobia
Reptiles described in 1923
Northern Congolian forest–savanna mosaic
Endemic fauna of the Democratic Republic of the Congo